Beauregard Houston-Montgomery is a doll collector and author on the subjects of doll making and doll collecting. He was formerly a contributing editor of the fashion periodical Details. He is also a socialite and photographer. More recently Houston-Montgomery served as Associate Producer for Perfect Day Films, on documentaries by Timothy Greenfield-Sanders, including About Face: Supermodels Then and Now, The Women's List, The Trans List, and Toni Morrison: The Pieces I Am. Houston-Montgomery, never one to hide his androgyny, now refers to himself as Gender Queer, after conferring with Janet Mock, with whom he worked on The Trans List.

Doll collecting
Houston-Montgomery wrote extensively on different models of doll and was a contributing editor of Doll Reader. He noted of competitor dolls of Barbie (pictured); Tressy and Dawn that they displayed a "glitzy lifestyle ... devoid of social responsibility, a precursor of the disco consciousness of the 1970s." He commented on Mattel's belated adoption of Fashion dolls in the mid 1980s. His book of his own photographs of dollhouses and tableaus, "Dollhouse Living", is considered a collector's item, as is his miniature Hanuman Books volume of essays and profiles title, "Pouf Pieces".

Entertainment

He interviewed Kim Novak for Interview magazine in December 1986 and has written features in Vanity Fair, Elle, Elle Decor, Harper's Bazaar, World of Interiors, HG, Vogue, Playgirl, The Advocate, and Torso. He was a close friend of Andy Warhol.

See also
Mildred Seeley

References

External links
Beauregard Houston-Montgomery – The Collector – Trailer – on YouTube
Houston-Montgomery, Wendy Goodman., Dollhouse Living, Fotofolio, 1 Oct 2000
Houston-Montgomery, Beauregard., Designer Fashion Dolls, Hobby House PressInc, 1 Jun 1999.

Living people
American non-fiction writers
Collectors
Year of birth missing (living people)